Garmab-e Pain (also Romanized as Garmāb-e Pā’īn and Garmāb Pā’īn; also known as Garmāb) is a village in Kharturan Rural District, Beyarjomand District, Shahrud County, Semnan Province, Iran. At the 2006 census, its population was 119, in 28 families.

References 

Populated places in Shahrud County